Green Line routes 702 and 703 are bus routes that run between Reading, Windsor, and London.

History 
In 2015, FirstGroup announced plans to withdraw all their services, including route 702, from Bracknell. However, it was subsequently announced that the route would be retained.

In December 2017, Reading Buses took over the 702 route from FirstGroup. For the first day of service on 24 December, passengers could board for free and various heritage vehicles were used on the route. First had previously announced it would withdraw the route as it said it had become unsustainable due to increasing costs of operation.

On 8 May 2018, route 703 was introduced. Buses were branded as the "Royal Express" and painted in a gold and purple livery, coinciding with the Wedding of Prince Harry and Meghan Markle.

From 2 November 2020, some early morning and late evening 702 journeys started running via the M4 between Reading and Slough.

In January 2021 route 702 was suspended due to low usage as a result of the COVID-19 lockdown.

Commencing 24 July 2022, route 703 will increase the frequency to provide a half-hourly service between Heathrow Airport and Slough, as a result of the Airport's partnership. This will also see an improved hourly frequency between Legoland and Slough throughout the day.

Vehicles 
The route is operated using Alexander Dennis Enviro400 MMCs. Seven  76-seater Alexander Dennis Enviro400 Citys were ordered to upgrade the service in February 2023.

References 

Green Line Coaches routes
Buses serving Heathrow Airport